(1149 – March 1, 1201) was a Japanese classical poet, who lived during the late Heian and early Kamakura periods.  She was the third daughter of Emperor Go-Shirakawa.  In 1159, Shikishi, who did not marry, went into service at the Kamo Shrine in Kyoto.  She left the shrine after some time, and in her later years became a Buddhist nun.

Shikishi is credited with 49 poems in the Shinkokinshū, a collection of some 2,000 popular works compiled in the early Kamakura period, and many other poems included in the Senzai Wakashū, compiled in the late Heian period to commemorate her father's ascension, and later compilations.

The poet's name is sometimes also pronounced as Shokushi (both on-yomi readings).  Modern given names using the same characters include Shikiko (mix of on- and kun-yomi) and Noriko (pure kun-yomi).  Her title of naishinnō translates to “Imperial Princess”.

Biography 

Though her exact date of birth is unknown, it is estimated that Princess Shikishi was born in 1150, and she died in the year 1201. She was the third daughter of Go-Shirakawa, seventy-seventh emperor of Japan beginning in the year 1155. During her lifetime, Japan saw turbulent times like the Hōgen and Heiji rebellions of 1156 and 1159, respectively, which involved competing samurai clans vying for political power. There were also numerous natural disasters, including a tornado, a famine, and an earthquake, all of which wreaked destruction on Japan's inhabitants.

During all this action, Shikishi was cloistered away for much of the time. In 1159, the Kamo Shrine chose her to be their thirty-first saiin or high priestess. An emperor-appointed position, the saiin represented the emperor by attending to the primary deities at the major Shinto shrines. To be saiin was an important and luxurious job—she factored largely in the annual rite, called the Kamo no Matsuri or Aoi Matsuri, which was celebrated with a great festival every year. She also had many attendants and lived in her own palace, but saiin could be a rather lonely appointment, as the girl would move away from her family and remain mostly separate from the public. As saiin, Shikishi would have lived near the capital, and her large number of attendants provided ample company; however, this career came with many restrictions and the government policies at the time made it difficult for princesses to marry. Shikishi remained in this position for ten years until she became ill, forcing her to depart the shrine in 1169. She dealt with several illnesses over the rest of her life, including what was probably breast cancer.

Around 1181, Shikishi became acquainted with Fujiwara no Shunzei, a famous poet of the time with whom she may have studied, and developed a friendship with his son Teika. Teika was also a renowned poet, and it is speculated that Shikishi and Teika were in a relationship. Much of Shikishi's poetry contains a tone of saddened longing, which has led some to believe she dealt with unrequited or unattainable love. Teika kept a thorough journal, in which he chronicles his visits to Shikishi. He and Shunzei would often visit her together, but Teika does not go into detail about these visits, though his concern for her appears in entries during the time when Shikishi's illness was worsening. A couple of times he wrote that he remained through the night, including a time Shikishi was especially ill and he stayed in “the northern corner of the kitchen”. Scholars disagree about whether or not Shikishi and Teika were lovers, and the evidence is too small to be certain either way.
In the 1190s, Shikishi took Buddhist vows to become a nun and adopted the name Shōnyohō, as she had become a believer in Pure Land Buddhism. Also in the 1190s, there were two separate instances of rumors that she had cursed notable women, one of the instances involving a plot against the government; and some believe she took the vows partly to escape punishment. No action was taken regarding either of these accusations, however.

Go-Toba had directed all notable poets in this year to submit some of their works for this anthology, and Shikishi wrote this set of poems in only twenty days despite being extremely ill. Beginning with twenty-five, eventually forty-nine of Shikishi's poems were chosen for the eighth imperial anthology, the Shin Kokin Wakashū (as opposed to only nine of Teika's), which altogether contained 1,979 poems. For the two decades between Shikishi and Teika's first meeting and the former's death, the latter's diary displays some of the ongoing health struggles Shikishi had until her death in 1201.

Poetry 

399 of Shikishi's poems are known of today, many of which are part of three sets: Sequences A, B, and C. The poetry form Shikishi used was called tanka, which involves grouping syllables into a set of 5-7-5-7-7. As this form was rather limited, the most widely used way of experimentation lay in stringing together several sets of these 5-7-5-7-7 lines to make longer poems.  Sequences A, B, and C were written in hundred-tanka sequences, called hyakushu-uta, and the rest of her poems are in smaller sets of tanka. Though it is difficult to be certain, Sequence A is thought to have been written sometime between 1169 (perhaps earlier) and 1194. It is believed that Sequence B was written between 1187 and 1194, and it is known for certain that Sequence C, the one she wrote for Go-Toba's poetry collection, was written in 1200 shortly before she died.
Sequences A and B both abide by the same subjects and numbers: Spring, 20 poems; Summer, 15 poems; Autumn, 20 poems; Winter, 15 poems; followed by Love, 15 poems; and Miscellany, 15 poems.
Sequence C contains the typical set of seasonal poems: 20 for Spring and Autumn, and 15 for Summer and Winter; followed by Love, 10 poems; Travels, 5 poems; Mountain Living, 5 poems; Birds, 5 poems; and Felicitations, 5 poems.
The many tanka in a hyakushu-uta each focus on a single component of the greater concept of the poem, coming together to form an interconnected whole. Tanka often made use of the literary technique kakekotoba, a method that involved using homonyms and homophones. For example, one of Shikishi's tanka reads:

In this poem, the segment furu of the word furiyuku means “to fall (like snow)” and also “to grow old”. The poem's use of kakekotoba connects the idea of the narrator's heart softening at the season's change to the idea that she is aging.
Shikishi also used a device called engo, or “related word”. Engo involves tying together imagery in a poem by using words that evoke similar ideas. In one poem she writes:

Here, the word hare, meaning “cleared” (“leaves are cleared”), also connects to the image of the clear light of the moon (tsukikage). 
Another more content-based technique that appears in Shikishi's writing is honka-dori, the taking of a passage by another poet and incorporating it into one's own work, without acknowledgement. Some may be uncomfortable with this technique, considering its resemblance to plagiarism. However, considering the restrictive structure of tanka, the limited subjects poets were allowed to write on, and the closed-off nature of Kyoto at this time, it is not surprising that different poets’ work would gradually begin to sound similar. Also, within Chinese methods of poetry writing which influenced Japanese poets, including someone else's work within one's own was seen as a tribute paid to another author, not an act of stealing.
There are differences in the ways scholars translate Shikishi's poetry:

Here are Shikishi's spring poems from Sequence A, translated by Sato.

A few of her other poems, not included in Sequences A, B, or C:

After resigning the vestal’s post at Kamo, on the Day of the Sacred Tree during the festival someone brought her a gift of aoi to offer her. She wrote on it:

Among the poems on “Love”:

Among the “Miscellaneous” poems:

Recognition 

Shikishi was recognized in fifteen out of twenty-one imperial anthologies. Fujiwara no Shunzei included nine of Shikishi's works in the Senzai Wakashū, the seventh imperial anthology, containing 1,288 poems. The eighth imperial anthology, the Shin Kokin Wakashū, compiled shortly after her death, included forty-nine of her poems. 155 of her poems are incorporated throughout the seventh imperial anthology to the twenty-first.

See also 
 Hyakunin Isshu

References 
 Kokugo Dai Jiten Dictionary, Shinsou-ban (Revised edition), Shogakukan, 1988.
 Hiroaki Sato, translator. String of Beads: Complete Poems of Princess Shikishi. University of Hawaii Press, 1993.  .
 Rodd, Laurel Rasplica. “Shikishi Naishinnō.” Dictionary of Literary Biography, vol. 203, 1999, pp. 261–264. EBSCO: Biography Reference Bank (H. W. Wilson):517989849
 Mostow, Joshua S., ed. (1996). Pictures of the Heart: The Hyakunin Isshu in Word and Image. Honolulu: University of Hawaii Press. ; OCLC 645187818

External links 
 photo—from an edition of Hyakunin Isshu, an anthology of waka poems; 89/100 from etext.lib.virginia.edu/japanese/hyakunin/frames/index/hyaku3euc.html
 photo—from Hyakunin Isshu card game, modern eras
 E-text of her poems (in Japanese)
 Biography—from BookRags

1201 deaths
12th-century births
12th-century Japanese women writers
12th-century Japanese writers
Japanese princesses
Japanese women poets
Year of birth unknown
Hyakunin Isshu poets
12th-century Japanese poets
Japanese Buddhist nuns
12th-century Buddhist nuns
Daughters of emperors